Kirugavalu  is a village in the southern state of Karnataka, India. Kirugavalu is located in the Malavalli taluk of Mandya district in Karnataka.

Kirugavalu is the village between mysore and malavalli highway.40km away from mysore.

kirugavalu has a historical temple that name was "shiva temple" .

It also have so many temples that are kalikamba temple, ganesha temple, maramma temple.

Demographics
 India census, Kirugavalu had a population of 7859 with 4059 males and 3800 females.

See also
 Mandya
 Districts of Karnataka

References

External links
 http://Mandya.nic.in/

Villages in Mandya district